Tomberg can refer to:

 Tomberg metro station. Brussels
 Jevgeni Tomberg (1948–2021), Estonian politician
 Richard Tomberg (1897–1982), Estonian military Major General 
 Valentin Tomberg (1900–1973), Russian Christian mystic and scholar